Invitation is a 1952 American melodrama film directed by Gottfried Reinhardt and starring Van Johnson, Dorothy McGuire and Ruth Roman. Johnson and McGuire play a happily married couple, until the wife learns a secret about her husband. The film was based on the short story "R.S.V.P." by Jerome Weidman. The theme song "Invitation" has since become a jazz standard.

Plot
Ellen Pierce (Dorothy McGuire) is very happily married to architect Dan (Van Johnson). However, due to a bout of rheumatic fever in her childhood, her heart is weak and she cannot exert herself too much; how frail she is, she does not really know. Her wealthy father (Louis Calhern) and the family doctor (Ray Collins) have kept from her the fact that she probably only has a few more months to live.

When Ellen visits acquaintance Maud Redwick (Ruth Roman), Dan's embittered former girlfriend, Maud reminds her about a vicious remark she had made at Ellen and Dan's wedding that he was only a "loan" for about a year. That, plus an invitation addressed to Dan to a medical conference and various other clues, leads Ellen to discover the truth, not only about her prognosis, but also an even more devastating secret: that her father had arranged the marriage to make her happy, and that Dan did not love her.

When Dan finds out, he confesses via flashbacks that he had initially rejected her father's offer, but due to a lack of success in his career, he had indeed married her at her father's behest. However, he tells her that he has since fallen deeply in love with her.

He tells her about a Doctor Toynberry who has come up with a new technique that has a good chance of curing her and begs her to undergo the operation he has arranged for her. If it is a success, they will know by spring. After absorbing everything, she goes through with the medical procedure. The film flashes forward to the spring, with her healthy and blissfully still married to Dan.

Cast 
 Van Johnson as Daniel I. Pierce
 Dorothy McGuire as Ellen Bowker Pierce
 Ruth Roman as Maud Redwick
 Louis Calhern as Simon Bowker
 Ray Collins as Dr. Warren Pritchard
 Michael Chekhov as Dr. Fromm, a specialist Dan consults
 Lisa Golm as 	Agnes, the Maid
 Barbara Ruick as Sarah
 Norman Field as Arthur, the Chauffeur
 Matt Moore as Paul, the Butler
 Pat Conway as Bill
 Alex Gerry as Professor Redwick
 Lucille Curtis as Mrs. Redwick
 Lisa Gohm as Agnes, the housekeeper/cook

Theme music
The theme music by Bronislau Kaper was originally used in A Life of Her Own (1950), but became a jazz standard after being used in this film and becoming known as "Invitation".

Box office
According to MGM records the film earned $855,000 in the US and Canada and $600,000 elsewhere resulting in a loss of $178,000.

References

External links 

 
 
 
 

1952 films
American black-and-white films
Films based on short fiction
1952 romantic drama films
Films directed by Gottfried Reinhardt
Films scored by Bronisław Kaper
Films set in Connecticut
Metro-Goldwyn-Mayer films
American romantic drama films
Melodrama films
1950s English-language films
1950s American films